Ed Tangen (1873–1951) was an American photographer and a ballistic expert who helped to solve crimes in the Boulder, Colorado area. Starting in 1923, he became an identification officer for the Boulder County Sheriff's Office and was a valuable resource in the analysis of handwriting, blood, hair and fibers with his photography. The Boulder County Sheriff's Office has called him a "Pioneer in forensic photography." He was an expert in ballistic, identifying firearms from spent projectiles.  His participation through photography in solving crimes and convicting murderers earned him the praise of the FBI director, J. Edgar Hoover.

Books
Ed Tangen, the Pictureman: A Photographic History of the Boulder Region, Early Twentieth Century.

References

1873 births
1951 deaths
20th-century American photographers
Ballistics experts